was a feudal domain in Edo period Japan, located in Dewa Province (modern-day Yamagata Prefecture), Japan. It was governed for the whole of its history by the Sakai clan, which resulted in an unusually stable and prosperous domain. During their rule over Shōnai, the Sakai clan was ranked as a  family, and as such, had the privilege of shogunal audiences in the Great Hall (Ohiroma) of Edo Castle. In the Boshin War of 1868–69, the domain joined the Ōuetsu Reppan Dōmei, the alliance of northern domains supporting the Tokugawa shogunate, but then later defected to the imperial side. As with all other domains, it was disbanded in 1871.

History
The Sakai rose to prominence with Sakai Tadatsugu, who was one of Tokugawa Ieyasu's Shitennō, or four leading generals and the daimyō of Matsushiro Domain in Shinano Province. After the death of Mogami Yoshiaki many internal struggles for control of the Mogami clan, the former rulers of Dewa Province, arouse and caused their vast domain to be divided into several parts. Sakai Tadatsugu was awarded the coastal region consisting of Tagawa, Akumi and Murayama districts, which increased his kokudaka from 38,000 koku to 138,000 koku, and then to 150,000 koku. However, the lands of the Shōnai region were fertile and well-watered, and eminently suited for growing rice, which gave the Sakai clan actual revenues of more than 200,000 koku. This revenue was further supplemented by the developed of Sakata port for the coastal kitamaebune trade, which gave the clan an actual income of closer to 300,000 koku.

In 1805, the domain academy, the Chidōkan was established by the 7th daimyō, Sakai Tadaari.
The domain faced a severe crisis during the time of the 9th daimyō, Sakai Tadakata, when it came to the attention of shōgun Tokugawa Ienari that the domain's revenues had been understated by some 200,000 koku for many decades. Ienari decided to relocate the Sakai clan to Nagaoka Domain (74,000 koku) and to move the Makino clan from Nagaoka to Kawagoe Domain (150,000 koku). Matsudaira Narisasa of in Kawagoe (who happened to be Ienari's son) would then be given Shōnai. The move was cancelled by the timely deaths of both Ienari and his son Matsudaira Narisada within weeks of each other in 1841 and Shōnai was "punished" by being assigned various public works projects.

During the Bakumatsu period, Shōnai was assigned the task of building fortifications and providing increased security for Edo from the incursions of foreign ships, and had its official income increased to 167,000 koku in 1864. In January 1868, samurai from Shōnai domain joined with Kaminoyama Domain in an attack on the Satsuma Domain residence in Edo – which marks the start of the Boshin War. Shōnai was initially a strong supporter of the Ōuetsu Reppan Dōmei, an alliance of northern domains against the forces of the western-based Satsuma-Chōshu Alliance attempting to overthrow the Tokugawa shogunate. However, Shōnai (along with the other military leader in the region, Aizu Domain) did not sign initially sign the treaty forming the Alliance and only became an official member in early 1868. Shōnai was regarded with caution by the Satchō Alliance, as it had deep financial resources, and had rearmed with modern weapons supplied by the Schnell brothers. However, after the defection of Kubota Domain to the imperial side, and the defeat of the Northern Alliance at the Battle of Hokuetsu and the Battle of Aizu, Shōnai Domain surrendered without a fight in December. Sakai Tadazumi turned the domain over to his son, Sakai Tadamichi and the domain was reduced to 120,000 koku. However, in June 1869, the Sakai were ordered to relocate to Iwakitaira Domain. This move was strongly protested by the people of the domain, who raised 300,000 ryō as payment to the Meiji government, and obtained the support of Saigō Takamori to have the order rescinded. The domain was abolished together with all of the domains in the abolition of the han system in 1871, becoming  Sakata Prefecture and Tsuruoka Prefecture, which then merged into Yamagata Prefecture. The Sakai clan was ennobled in 1885, becoming hakushaku (counts) in the kazoku peerage.

List of daimyō
  Sakai clan (fudai) 1622–1871

Genealogy (simplified)

 I. Sakai Tadakatsu, 1st daimyō of Shōnai (Tsuruoka) (cr. 1622) (1594–1647; daimyō: 1622–1647)
 II. Tadamasa, 2nd daimyō of Shōnai (Tsuruoka) (1617–1660; r. 1647–1660)
  III. Tadayoshi, 3rd daimyō of Shōnai (Tsuruoka) (1644–1681; r. 1660–1681)
  IV. Tadazane, 4th daimyō of Shōnai (Tsuruoka) (1671–1731; r. 1682–1731)
 Tadatsune, 1st daimyō of Dewa-Matsuyama (1639–1675)
 Tadayasu, 2nd daimyō of Dewa-Matsuyama (1657–1736)
  V. Tadayori, 5th daimyō of Shōnai (Tsuruoka) (1704–1766; r. 1731–1766)
  VI. Tadaatsu, 6th daimyō of Shōnai (Tsuruoka) (1732–1767; r. 1766–1767)
  VII. Tadaari, 7th daimyō of Shōnai (Tsuruoka) (1755–1812; r. 1767–1805)
  VIII. Tadakata, 8th daimyō of Shōnai (Tsuruoka) (1790–1854; r. 1805–1842)
 IX. Tadaaki, 9th daimyō of Shōnai (Tsuruoka) (1812–1876; r. 1842–1861)
 XI. Tadazumi, 11th daimyō of Shōnai (Tsuruoka), 17th and 19th family head, 1st Count (1853–1915; daimyō: 1862–1868; 17th family head: 1862–1868; 19th family head: 1880–1915; Count: cr. 1884)
 Tadanaga, 20th family head, 2nd Count (1888–1962; 20th family head: 1915–1962; 2nd Count: 1915–1947) 
 Tadaakira, 21st family head (1917–2004; 21st family head: 1962–2004)
 Tadahisa, 22nd family head (born 1946; 22nd family head: 2004–present)
 Tadamasa (born 1974)
  XII. Tadamichi, 12th daimyō of Shōnai (Tsuruoka), 18th family head (1856–1921; daimyō: 1868–1869; Governor: 1869–1871; 18th family head: 1871–1880)
  X. Tadatomo, 10th daimyō of Shōnai (Tsuruoka) (1839–1862; r. 1861–1862)

Bakumatsu period holdings
Dewa Province (Uzen)
 399 villages in Tagawa District
249 villages in Akumi District 
Ezo (Ishikari)
1 trading post in Hamamasu District
Ezo (Teshio)
1 trading post in Teshio District
1 trading post in Nakagawa District
1 trading post in Kawakami District
1 trading post in Rumoi District
1 trading post in Tomamae District

Subsidiary domains

Dewa-Matsuyama Domain

 was founded in 1647 for Sakai Tadatsune, the third son of Sakai Tadakatsu, who was assigned 20,000 koku of new rice lands in Akumi District. The third daimyō, Sakai Tadayoshi served as wakadoshiyori, and was awarded an additional 5000 koku in Kōzuke Province. During the Boshin War, the domain sided with the Ōuetsu Reppan Dōmei, for which it was punished by the Meiji government with the loss of 2500 koku. It was renamed  in 1869, and was abolished with all the other domains in 1871. The final daimyō, Sakai Tadamasa subsequently received the kazoku peerage title of shishaku (viscount).

  Sakai clan (fudai) 1647–1871

Bakumatsu-period holdings 
Dewa Province (Uzen)
 62 villages in Murayama District
 10 villages in Tagawa District 
 44 villages in Akumi District
Kōzuke Province
 6 villages in Seta District

Ōyama Domain
 was founded in 1647 for Sakai Tadatoki, the seventh son of Sakai Tadakatsu, who was assigned 10,000 koku of new rice lands in Tagawa District. It reverted to the parent domain on his death in 1668 without an heir.

Notes

References 
 Onodera, Eikō (2005). Boshin nanboku sensō to Tōhoku seiken. Sendai: Kita no mori.

External links
  "Tsuruoka-han" on Edo 300 HTML (accessed 15 August 2008)

Domains of Japan
States and territories established in 1622
1622 establishments in Japan
1871 disestablishments in Japan
States and territories disestablished in 1871
Dewa Province
History of Yamagata Prefecture
Ōuetsu Reppan Dōmei